Statistics of Scottish Football League in season 1969/1970.

Scottish League Division One

Scottish League Division Two

See also
1969–70 in Scottish football

References

 
Scottish Football League seasons